Xylorhiza is a genus of flowering plants in the family Asteraceae, known as woodyasters. These are daisylike wildflowers usually having blue to purple or white ray flowers with yellow centers of disc florets. Woodyasters are native to western North America.

Species
 Xylorhiza cognata - Mecca woodyaster - California (Imperial + Riverside Counties)
 Xylorhiza confertifolia - Henrieville woodyaster - Utah (Kane, Wayne, + Garfield Counties)
 Xylorhiza cronquistii - Cronquist's woodyaster - Utah (Kane + Garfield Counties)
 Xylorhiza frutescens - Baja California
 Xylorhiza glabriuscula - smooth woodyaster - Wyoming, Utah (Daggett County), Colorado (Routt + Moffat Counties), Montana (Carbon County), South Dakota (Harding, Butte, Fall River Counties)
 Xylorhiza orcuttii - Orcutt's aster - California (Imperial + San Diego Counties)
 Xylorhiza tortifolia - Mojave woodyaster - California, Nevada, Utah, Arizona
 Xylorhiza venusta - charming woodyaster - Utah, Colorado, New Mexico (Colfax County)
 Xylorhiza wrightii - Big Bend woodyaster - western Texas, Chihuahua

References

External links
 USDA Plants Profile for Xylorhiza (woodyasters)
  Calflfora Database: Xylorhiza species in California — images + info links.
 Jepson Manual eFlora (TJM2) treatment of Xylorhiza

Astereae
Asteraceae genera
Flora of the Western United States
Taxa named by Thomas Nuttall